The national symbols of Wales include various official and unofficial images and other symbols.

Flags

Welsh heraldry

British (formerly English) monarchy heraldry

Plants and animals

Welsh Language 
The Welsh language is considered a symbol and icon of Wales and considered a "cornerstone of Welsh identity". Spoken throughout Wales by around 750,000 people, it is present on television, radio, road signs and road markings.

Welsh mottos 
 "" ("Wales forever") is a popular Welsh motto. 
"" ("I am true to my country"), taken from the National Anthem of Wales, appears on the 2008 Royal Badge of Wales, the Welsh Seal used during the reign of Elizabeth II and on the edge of £1 coins that depict Welsh symbols.
 "" ("the red dragon inspires action" /  "the red dragon shall lead") appeared on the Royal Badge of Wales when it was created in 1953 until 2008. It also appeared on £1 coins as the motto of Cardiff.

Music

Hen Wlad Fy Nhadau is the traditional national anthem of Wales. The words were written by Evan James and the tune was composed by his son, James James, both residents of Pontypridd, Glamorgan, in January 1856. The earliest written copy survives and is part of the collections of the National Library of Wales.

Male voice choirs are considered a Welsh symbol. Traditional members of the movement include the Treorchy choir and the Morriston choir. More recently, the success Only Men Aloud has also played a part in continuing this tradition.

The Welsh harp, also known as the triple harp is considered to be the national instrument of Wales.

Art 

The earliest known dated lovespoon  from Wales, displayed in the St Fagans National History Museum near Cardiff, is from 1667, although the tradition is believed to date back long before that.

Costume 

The unique Welsh hat, which first made its appearance in the 1830s, was used as an icon of Wales from the 1840s. 

From the 1880s, when the traditional costume had gone out of general use, selected elements of it became adopted as a National Costume. From then on it was worn by women at events such as Royal visits, by choirs, at church and chapel, for photographs and occasionally at eisteddfodau. It was first worn by girls as a celebration on Saint David's Day just before the First World War. The costume is now recognised as the national dress of Wales.

References